Kłodawa  (German Kladow) is a village in Gorzów County, Lubusz Voivodeship, in western Poland. It is the seat of the gmina (administrative district) called Gmina Kłodawa.

The village had a population of 2,700 in 2016.

References

Villages in Gorzów County

it:Kłodawa (Lubusz)